Saheb Al-Abdullah [صاحب العبدالله in Arabic] (born 21 June 1977) is a Saudi football player. He currently plays for Al-Sawab as a midfielder.

Honours

Al-Ahli (Jeddah)
Saudi Crown Prince Cup: 2007
Gulf Club Champions Cup: 2008
Saudi Champions Cup: 2011, 2012

References

 

Saudi Arabian footballers
1977 births
Living people
Al-Ahli Saudi FC players
Najran SC players
Khaleej FC players
2004 AFC Asian Cup players
Al-Nahda Club (Saudi Arabia) players
Al-Adalah FC players
Al Jeel Club players
Al Omran Club players
Saudi First Division League players
Saudi Professional League players
Saudi Fourth Division players
Association football midfielders
Saudi Arabia international footballers
Saudi Arabian Shia Muslims